Barry James Meguiar (born July 24, 1942) in Pasadena, California was the President of Meguiar's, Inc., a California-based company of car care products founded in 1901. and former host of Discovery's Velocity (TV Channel) series Car Crazy.

Early life
Frank Meguiar, Jr., Barry's grandfather, founded Meguiar's Inc. in the garage of his Indiana home in 1901. In 1913, Frank moved the business to Southern California, where the family focused on making products for the professional market. Barry's father, Malcolm Meguiar, and his two brothers carried on the family business in 1950. Barry's involvement at Meguiar's began in grade school and continued throughout college, when he served as the one-man accounting department generating $600,000 in annual gross sales.

After graduating from college, Barry oversaw the company's relationships with GM, Ford, and Chrysler, and managed sales in the Eastern United States. In 1969, Barry took Meguiar's products into the consumer marketplace. Barry set out to create a new brand of Meguiar's products that targeted car enthusiasts. After four years, Meguiar's Inc. launched its first consumer product, the Meguiar's Liquid Cleaner Wax, at the 1973 APAA Show in Chicago.

Barry led a grassroots program to sell his products at car shows, which grew into the international marketing campaign that became the backbone of Meguiar's global brand.

Career
By mid-1990, car shows and car clubs were suffering in attendance and decreasing in number with the aging population. With a passion for promoting and growing the hobby, Barry created "Car Crazy," a television show for auto enthusiasts that showcases interviews with celebrities and other "car crazed" enthusiasts. Soon after its debut in August 2000, Barry created a radio show of the same name, which emulated the television show and was syndicated to approximately 100 stations throughout the U.S. by Talk America Radio Networks.

Successfully reviving the car hobby in the next generation, the "Car Crazy" TV Show stood as the longest running show on Fox's Speed Channel, an all-motorsports network since 1995. It was moved to broadcast through Discovery's Velocity Channel, with the ending broadcast date around 2008, when Meguiars was acquired by the 3M Corporation. While no longer on Cable TV and no new shows being produced, past shows can now be seen on YouTube.

In 2008, Meguiar's Inc., the 100-year-old family business that manufactures the leading Meguiar's brand of car care products, was acquired by 3M, a Fortune 500 company.

Health and illness
In 2010, Barry contracted a rare virus during a filming of his show "Car Crazy" outside of the States. He was admitted to a hospital, where he spent the next 17 days in critical condition. Barry was diagnosed with a rare strain of viral pneumonia and was placed in an induced coma battling life-threatening conditions. As Barry's staff prepared his obituary, Barry made a dramatic recovery within 24 hours of intensive care and the illness subsided as quickly as it had arisen.

Religion and ministry
In 1973, Barry encountered a man with a passion for leading people in the Christian faith and immediately wanted to experience the same joy in his own life. In 1976, Barry was convinced that his business was his pulpit, and in 2000, embraced the vision for a ministry that encourages others to share their faith.

Barry identifies the recovery from his illness in 2010 as the day he received marching orders from God for the rest of his life. In 2011, Barry founded Revival Outside the Walls, a ministry devoted to bringing purpose and excitement to followers of Jesus Christ.

Revival Outside the Walls
Revival Outside the Walls (ROTW) was founded by Barry Meguiar in 2011 as a non-clergy, lay-led ministry. ROTW serves as an evangelical Christian organization that operates in respect to the traditional church. ROTW has a mission to serve as more of a resource than a ministry and is dedicated to providing tools for intentional faith sharing. ROTW has 60 second radio segments, the "60 Second Recharge,"  and features video resources to support the need for evangelism. Latest guests featured on the website include Brent Garrison, Director of CEO Relations at CEO Forum, and Dr. James Dobson, Founder of Christian radio channel Family Talk.

Religious involvement and recognition
 Pt. Loma Nazarene University's Alumnus of the Year
 Church Board Member, Secretary, Treasurer and Chairman
 General Council of the Assemblies of God's Layman of the Year
 Chairman of Lay Ministries for the Assemblies of God
 Chairman of David Wilkerson's World Challenge Board of Directors
 Founder/President, Revival Outside the Walls

References

External links
 Meguiar's homepage
 Revival Outside the Walls homepage

1942 births
American chemical industry businesspeople
American evangelicals
People from Pasadena, California
People from Irvine, California
Living people